Boone House may refer to:

Boone House (Little Rock, Arkansas), listed on the National Register of Historic Places (NRHP)
Boone-Murphy House, Pine Bluff, AR, listed on the NRHP in Arkansas
Boone House (St. Petersburg, Florida), NRHP-listed
Daniel Boone House, Defiance, MO, listed on the NRHP in Missouri
John W. Boone House, Columbia, MO, listed on the NRHP in Missouri
Nathan Boone House, Ash Grove, MO, listed on the NRHP in Missouri
Boone-Withers House, Waynesville, NC, listed on the NRHP in North Carolina
Daniel Boone Homestead Site and Bertolet Cabin, Birdsboro, PA, NRHP-listed
Boone Hall Plantation House and Historic Landscape, Mount Pleasant, SC, listed on the NRHP in South Carolina
Boone-Douthit House, Pendleton, SC, NRHP-listed